Harry Washington was a Black Loyalist in the American Revolutionary War, and enslaved by Virginia planter George Washington, later the first President of the United States. When the war was lost the British then evacuated him to Nova Scotia. In 1792 he joined nearly 1,200 freedmen for resettlement in Sierra Leone, where they set up a colony of free people of color.

Harry had been born in Gambia and sold into slavery as a war captive. He was purchased by George Washington, who had plantations in Virginia. During the American Revolutionary War, Harry Washington escaped from slavery in Virginia and served as a corporal in the Black Pioneers attached to a British artillery unit. After the war he was among Black Loyalists resettled by the British in Nova Scotia, where they were granted land. There Washington married Jenny, another freed American slave.

In 1792 the couple were among more than 1,000 freedmen chosen to migrate to Sierra Leone, West Africa, where the British had established a new colony of people of African descent. In 1800 Washington joined a rebellion against the British colonial authorities in the Sierra Leone Colony. He was exiled to the Bullom Shore, where he subsequently died.

Early life

Washington was a saltwater slave (a term for American slaves born in Africa, rather than in North America), born in the Gambia River in West Africa around 1740. In the colony of Virginia, he was purchased in 1763 to be part of George Washington's workforce in the Great Dismal Swamp of southeastern Virginia and northeastern North Carolina.

Washington later went to work on one of the Washington plantations in Mount Vernon, Virginia Colony. In 1771 he escaped from Mount Vernon and took refuge in New York, but later returned to the Washingtons. He had been working in the stables at Mount Vernon, caring for Washington's horses, when he fled again in 1776 to join the Virginia Ethiopian Regiment, made up of escaped slaves and established by Royal Governor Lord Dunmore during the American Revolutionary War. Dunmore had recruited slaves of rebel masters, promising them freedom if they joined the British military effort.

American Revolutionary War
Moving to New York in late 1776, Washington served as corporal in the Loyalist Black Pioneers, attached to a British artillery unit and part of the British forces in Governor Lord Dunmore's fleet. The British occupied New York City through much of the war.

At the end of the American Revolution, Washington was one of about 3,000 Black Loyalists evacuated from New York by the British and resettled in Nova Scotia. The Crown granted the Loyalists land there. When Sir Guy Carleton's officials included him on the list for evacuation in the "Register of Negroes", Washington gave his age as forty-three and said he had fled Mount Vernon in 1776.

Emigration to Nova Scotia and then Sierra Leone

Under General Carleton's policy, Harry Washington took a British ship to Nova Scotia (as did two other former Mount Vernon slaves, a man and a woman). He lived for several years in Birchtown, Nova Scotia, Canada, which had become the largest free African-American city in North America. There he married Jenny, another freed slave, and they began to plan for their future.

Discontented with conditions in Nova Scotia, he and his wife chose to join the 1,192 black colonists who migrated to Sierra Leone, West Africa (see Nova Scotian Settlers), a new colony founded by the British in West Africa. He planned to begin a farm, using scientific farming techniques he had learned at Mount Vernon.

Rebellion in Sierra Leone
In 1800 Washington was among several hundred settlers who rose up in a brief rebellion against British rule. The precipitating issue was one familiar from the American Revolution: taxation. The Sierra Leone Company, which ran the colony for the British government, required the settlers to pay taxes, called quitrents, for using their land, which land remained the property of the company. The rebels formed a provisional government and wrote a set of laws, which they nailed to the office door of a company administrator.

Internal exile and death
The Sierra Leone Company responded by sending a corps of recently arrived black Jamaican maroons against the rebels. In the trials that followed the defeat of the rebellion, Washington was among the rebels sentenced to banishment to Bullom Shore, another location in Sierra Leone. He became one of the two leaders of a new settlement but died there of disease. His descendants and those of other African Americans make up a portion of the Sierra Leone Creole people.

See also
 George Washington and slavery
 List of enslaved people of Mount Vernon
 List of slaves

Notes

References
Cassandra Pybus, Epic Journeys of Freedom: Runaway Slaves of the American Revolution and Their Global Quest for Liberty, Beacon Press, 2006.
"Washington, Henry (ca. 1740-post 1801)", BlackPast.org.

https://books.google.com/books?id=6qJ71dqsmboC&pg=PA98&dq=virginia+blacks+freetown&sig=oROaLz33TNPFyyYwJ-lCg3blX-0
"Epic Journeys of Freedom: Runaway Slaves of the American Revolution and Their Global Quest for Liberty", a Talk by Cassandra Pybus
Black Loyalist.info, Harry Washington
The Black Commentator.
Birchtown Black Loyalists, 1783.
Hanging Captain Gordon: The Life and Trial of an American Slave Trader
The Shaping of America: A Geographical Perspective on 500 Years of History: Volume 2: Continental America, 1800-1867

1740 births
Year of birth uncertain
1800 deaths
American people of Gambian descent
African Americans in the American Revolution
Black Loyalists
Sierra Leone Creole people
Sierra Leonean people of Gambian descent
Nova Scotian Settlers
Mount Vernon slaves
Great Dismal Swamp
Loyalist military personnel of the American Revolutionary War
Loyalists in the American Revolution from Virginia